Omladinski fudbalski klub Bar was a Montenegrin football club based in the town of Bar. The club existed from 2001 to 2012.

History
OFK Bar were founded in 2001 and played their home games at the Stadion Topolica.
At season 2008–09, OFK Bar won the champions title in the Montenegrin Third League. A year later, as a second-placed team from Second League, the club gained promotion to the Montenegrin First League, which was a historical success of OFK Bar. At that season (2010-11), for the first time in history, the city of Bar had two teams in the First League. OFK Bar and FK Mornar played three games (1-0, 0–1, 1-1). OFK Bar finished the season in last position under manager Zlatko Kostić, which meant relegation to the Montenegrin Second League. At the same season, OFK Bar made the best result in the Montenegrin Cup, with participation in the quarterfinals.

During the winter 2012, as a member of the Second League, OFK Bar was dissolved due to financial problems.

First League Record
OFK Bar played in Montenegrin First League on season 2010–11.

Honours and achievements
Montenegrin Second League – 0
runners-up (1): 2009–10
Montenegrin Third League – 1
winners (1): 2008–09

Players

Final squad
Below is the squad which played for OFK Bar during the season 2011–12.

Notable players
For the list of former players with Wikipedia article, please see :Category:OFK Bar players.

See also
Stadion Topolica
Bar

External links
OFK Bar profile at the Football Association of Montenegro website
Profile by Weltfussballarchiv  

2001 establishments in Montenegro
Defunct football clubs in Montenegro
OFK Bar